The locomotives of the  Bavarian Class D VII were saturated steam locomotives of the Royal Bavarian State Railways (Königlich Bayerische Staatsbahn). 

The D VII was built, in parallel with the D VI, as a six-coupled locomotive for hilly routes. A total of 75 examples were made, 41 by Krauss and 34 by Maffei. From 1885 the locomotives were somewhat longer, and had more water and coal capacity, so were also heavier.

The Deutsche Reichsbahn-Gesellschaft took over all 75 locomotives in 1925 as DRG Class 98.76 (Baureihe 98.76). Most were retired by the end of the 1920s, the last one however not until 1935.

One example, D VII no. 1854 – later 98 7658, is in the branch line museum at Bayerisch Eisenstein owned by the Bavarian Localbahn Society.

See also 
 Royal Bavarian State Railways
 List of Bavarian Locomotives

References 

0-6-0T locomotives
D 07
Standard gauge locomotives of Germany
Krauss locomotives
Maffei locomotives
Railway locomotives introduced in 1880
C n2t locomotives
Freight locomotives